Lumpens is a South Korean-based video production company formed and led by art director Yong-seok Choi. They consist of a group of directors and producers in the field of video production, specializing mostly in the production of music videos, television advertisements, experimental films, graphic design, and visual art.

Background
Starting as a visual art production company by Yeon-seok Choi, 'Lumpens' was a nickname given to Choi by a college professor referring to the German insult. The company initially focused on commercials and fashion shoots.  In 2010, their V.A.J.P (Visual Art Jam Performance) garnered some attention, but Choi says the first real recognition came after he showcased a 3D version of animation Robot Taekwon V at a fan convention in January 2011. As part of 'thecreatorsproject', they began making popular music videos with Yoon Mi-rae, working with her on the music video for Get It In in 2011.

Since then, they have worked with various South Korean artists, including BTS, MFBTY, Cho Yong-pil, Rain, Lee Hyori, Sistar, Wonder Girls, Younha, Hyuna, Spica, ENHYPEN and IU among others. When discussing the filming of Sunmi's Lalalay music video, she remarked, "this time it was directed by Lumpens, who seems to know me best. Because of this, he [Choi] was able to catch every move and there were minimal difficulties during filming." In 2014, the company began working with Big Hit Entertainment, starting a prolific partnership with BTS. They have also worked closely with a small number of independent artists, such as ee and Guckkasten.

Their work has also received multiple honors, including the nomination for 2013 Mnet Asian Music Awards Music Video of the Year for Cho Yong-pil's "Hello", 2017 Melon Music Awards Music Video of the Year for BTS' "DNA", 2018 Melon Music Awards Best Music Video Award for Ko Yoo-jeong's direction on GFriend's "Time for the Moon Night"), 2018 Mnet Asian Music Awards Fan Choice Best Music Video for BTS' "Idol", 2020 Mnet Asian Music Awards Best Video Director of the Year for BTS' "Butter", and 2021 nomination for MTV Video Music Award for Best Editing Yong Seok Choi's work on BTS' "Butter"

Videography

Music videos

References

External links

South Korean music video directors
Advertising directors
Melon Music Award winners